Go_A is a Ukrainian folktronica band formed in 2012. The band represented Ukraine in the Eurovision Song Contest 2021, performing "Shum", and placed fifth in the final.

The band's name was made by combining the English word "Go" with the Greek letter "Alpha", which symbolizes the beginning of everything, and the band's name is symbolic for "return to the roots".

The band includes vocalist Kateryna Pavlenko from Nizhyn, keyboardist and percussionist Taras Shevchenko from Kyiv, Ihor Didenchuk from Lutsk, also a member of rap group Kalush, and Ivan Hryhoriak from Bukovyna.

The band sings exclusively in the Ukrainian language.

History
The group was founded after keyboardist and percussionist Taras Shevchenko, not related to the poet Taras Shevchenko, met folk singer Kateryna Pavlenko in 2012. In December 2012, the first song "Koliada" (Коляда) was released.

The band gained attention after the release of the single "Vesnianka" (Веснянка), which won the national competition The Best Track in Ukraine 2015. For six weeks, the song stayed at number one on the 10Dance chart of the Kiss FM radio station in Ukraine and was awarded Discovery of the Year by the radio station.

In November 2016, Go_A released their debut album Idy na zvuk (Іди на звук; Follow the Tune) via Moon Records Ukraine. The album consists of ten songs, including  "Vesnianka". In early 2017, they released a Christmas single "Shchedryi vechir" (Щедрий вечір) in collaboration with Katya Chilly.

On 22 February 2020, Go_A, performing "Solovey", earned the right to represent Ukraine at the Ukraine in the Eurovision Song Contest 2020 by winning both the public vote and the jury vote in the qualifier finals. However, on 18 March 2020, the event was cancelled due to the COVID-19 pandemic and Suspilne Ukraine announced that the band would represent the country in the Eurovision Song Contest 2021. On 4 February 2021, it was announced that "Shum" would be the song that Go_A would be performing in Rotterdam at the Eurovision final on 22 May 2021. "Shum" placed fifth, with 364 combined public and jury points. However, in the public vote, "Shum" placed second with 267 points. Band member Ihor Didenchuk is also a member of rap group Kalush, which won the contest for Ukraine .

The band played shows in Europe in late 2022 and early 2023.

Discography

Albums

Singles

References

2012 establishments in Ukraine
Articles with underscores in the title
Electronic music groups
Folktronica musicians
Eurovision Song Contest entrants for Ukraine
Eurovision Song Contest entrants of 2020
Eurovision Song Contest entrants of 2021
Musical groups established in 2012
Ukrainian rock music groups